De Kroon is a residential and office skyscraper in the Center of The Hague, Netherlands. It contains 6 floor of office space combined with 13 floors of public housing, and 27 floors of houses for sale. Construction of De Kroon started in 2008 and ended in 2011. It was designed by architectural firm Rapp + Rapp and built by MAB Development BV.

References

External links
 De Kroon English site
 

Skyscraper office buildings in the Netherlands
Office buildings completed in 2011
Residential buildings completed in 2011
Skyscrapers in The Hague